During the Civil War in Afghanistan, Mullah Ezat (Mullah Izzat, Ezatullah) was a commander from Paghman, Afghanistan, for the forces of Ittihad-i Islami and Abdul Rasul Sayyaf and Jamiat-e Islami. During the resistance against the Soviets, he was supposedly a member of Ahmad Shah Massoud's Supervisory Council of the North, commanding 600 men. He was reportedly involved in the planning of the Afshar Operation which resulted in the deaths of hundreds of civilians.

During the fighting in Kabul it was reported that his men were engaged in kidnapping. For example one claim of kidnapping and abducting, with the hostage being Bagh-e Daoud was attributed to Ezat's men. Other claims of attacks against Hazara's have been attributed to Ezat's men.

References

Year of birth missing (living people)
Living people